Mehala (obsolete: Măhală) is a district of Timișoara. Mehala evolved from a slum-like village (in Turkish mahale means "slum") to a neighborhood of houses, villas and many gardens. It is one of the oldest satellite villages of Timișoara and was built in the higher part of the city, west of Palanca Mare. It officially became part of the city in 1910.

History

Antiquity 
Mehala was supposedly inhabited in the pre-Dacian period. An Eneolithic settlement was identified here in the 1970s. Further archeological excavations brought to surface several ceramic fragments from the classical Dacian period (1st century BC–1st century AD) and the Árpád dynasty (11th–12th centuries).

Ottoman occupation 
Mehala has long been an independent commune, whose name comes from the Turkish language, mahale meaning "slum" or "suburb". This name was given to it during the Turkish occupation of Banat, between 1552 and 1716. Travelers coming from the west often stopped here, after the gates of the fortress closed, being forced to spend the night at the inns or in the stables in the area. Here was the summer residence of the Ottoman pashas, known as the "Wells of the Pashas", where the ahidnâme was signed in 1716; the Turks had previously been defeated in the fortress of Timișoara by the Habsburg troops led by Eugene of Savoy. The residence is said to have been connected to the fortress by underground passages. The Wells of the Pashas were later renamed Präsidentengarten and were used by local leaders as a place of relaxation until 1849 when Timișoara was besieged by revolutionaries and the residence was completely destroyed. In the many decades of Turkish rule even slight offenses were severely punished. This could be the reason why the few people who settled here chose to live as far away from the fortress as possible.

Habsburg rule 

For the next 65 years Mehala was made part of the city and in 1716 it received the name Neustadt (which in German translates as "new city"; Hungarians called it Újváros). In 1723, during the construction of the new fortifications, which were extended far beyond the Turkish palisades, Palanca Mare had to be demolished. Since the Orthodox Rascians (collective term for Romanians and Serbs) were not allowed to settle in the fortress at that time, many of them moved to what is now Mehala. After the fire and plague of 1738, the Romanian population of Mehala increased considerably. By 1744 Mehala was subordinated to the Rascian magistrate of Timișoara. In 1779 the Banat of Temeswar was incorporated into Hungary and divided into counties. The villages and estates, which were all in the possession of the Vienna's Imperial Chamber, were put up for auction. Mehala was also a Chamber estate, but being considered a suburb of Timișoara, the settlement was ceded in 1782 by the Chamber without auction to Timișoara, which requested Mehala at an estimated price of 101,482 florins and 32 ½ kreutzers. After the death of Emperor Joseph II (1790) many of his decisions and contracts concluded during his reign were annulled. This also happened with Mehala's contract of sale. As the price agreed in 1781 in the "Deed of privilege of the free city" was not paid to the Chamber by the city, the actual handover of Mehala did not take place. Mehala was thus separated from the city and placed under the control of the administration of the Temes County as an independent village under the name "Mehala". At the beginning of the 20th century, the commune had about 300 houses with gardens, grouped in four distinct colonies – Ronaț, Anheurer, Blașcovici and Weisz – between which there were no roads or paved sidewalks. On today's territory of Mehala there was a large forest, called Cioca Forest, which was cut down entirely, because it was considered that the land brought a higher income if it was used as arable land.

Annexation and following years 
Lengthy judicial arguments about where Mehala belonged were finally concluded after much trial and tribulation with a judicial sentence on 1 January 1910. The Supreme Court decision intended that Mehala be officially assigned under the new name of Franzstadt ( "Franz's city", after Emperor Franz Joseph I; in Hungarian Ferencváros) as the 5th constituency of Timișoara. The handover was made in a festive setting, in the town hall, by deputy count Sándor Ferenczy and mayor Carol Telbisz. Mehala was to be represented in the Municipal Council by Alexander Hermann, József Egyed, Ioan Pavlovits and Petar Petrovits. In 1910 Mehala had 8,797 inhabitants, out of which 3,149 Germans, 2,419 Romanians, 2,275 Hungarians and 832 Serbs. From now on, Mehala has experienced a vertiginous development: roads to the city and sidewalks were paved, street lighting was introduced and kindergartens and schools were established. In 1923 Mehala was connected to the Timișoara tram network; since then line 4 has connected Avram Iancu Square with the central Liberty Square. In the interwar period, the district was temporarily renamed Prince Michael, after soon-to-be King Michael I; however, the use of this name was limited, with Mehala being preferred.

Avram Iancu Square 

Avram Iancu Square, nicknamed the "square with three churches", is the central square of the district, where the Romanian Orthodox, the Serbian Orthodox and the Roman Catholic churches are located. The Serbian church dedicated to Saint Nicholas was the first church in Mehala. It was built of brick between 1786 and 1793. This church served both Serbian and Romanian worshipers, with services held in both languages, until the hierarchical separation of the Romanian Church from the Serbian Church. During the Hungarian Revolution of 1848 the church was transformed by the revolutionaries into a stable. The church once had a confessional school, a football team and a choir called Zora. 

The second-oldest church is the Roman Catholic one; it was built in 1887 with money donated by the Catholic inhabitants of Mehala. It rises on the western side of the square and stands out for its neo-Gothic style with neo-Romanesque elements.

The Romanian church, also called the Mehala Cathedral due to its imposing dimensions, was built between 1925 and 1937 in neo-Byzantine style. The plans of the church were made by architects Victor Vlad, professor at the Polytechnic School, and Adrian Suciu, the chief architect of the city. The groundbreaking ceremony was attended, among others, by King Ferdinand I, Queen Marie and princes Carol and Ileana. The church is dedicated to the Ascension of Jesus and commemorates the Romanian martyrs who fell during World War I.

Notable people 
 Aladár Szoboszlay (1925–1958), Roman Catholic priest
 Béla Uitz (1887–1972), painter

References 

Districts of Timișoara